Tanel Veenre (born 5 May 1977) is Estonian jewellery artist and designer of brand Tanel Veenre.

Life
Tanel Veenre was born in Tallinn and grew up in a family of artists and musicians. He studied under Kadri Mälk at the Estonian Academy of Arts where he graduated in 2005 after having taken part in an exchange program in Gerrit Rietveld Academy.

Work
Tanel Veenre has participated since 1994 in at least 200 events between, fairs, shows, art gallery exhibitions and fashion shows in Estonia, Germany, United States of America, Spain, Portugal, Italy, Taiwan, China, Israel, Finland, Sweden, Brazil, Mexico etc. His body adornments have enhanced the windows of Selfridges retail store in London. 
Tanel Veenre has been working as a fashion photographer (campaigns for Aldo Järvsoo, Monton, Ivo Nikkolo), journalist and editor (Muusa, Eesti Päevaleht, Eesti Ekspress). He has been giving lectures and workshops in Konstfack, China Academy of Art, Tainan National University of the Arts, Monterrey Institute of Technology and Higher Education, Shenkar College of Engineering and Design, Oslo National Academy of the Arts and in many other institutions.
Since 2012 professor in Estonian Academy of Arts.
Tanel Veenre is a board member of Art Jewelry Forum.

Galleries
Tanel Veenre is represented by the following galleries: 
 Ornamentum in Hudson NY
 Platina in Stockholm
 RA in Amsterdam
 Putti in Riga
Alice Floriano Gallery
Alice Floriano Gallery

Monographies
 "Jewel. Hesitations in Art / Ehe. Kahtlused kunsti kujul", 2009
 "Handful / Käeulatuses", 2015

Awards
 National Cultural Award (2016)
 International Fashion Showcase, best display and curating, London Fashion Week (2014)
 Young Cultural Figure Award (2012)
 Kristjan Raud Art Award (2010)

Personal life
Tanel Veenre is in a long-term relationship with fashion artist Aldo Järvsoo.

References

External links
 Official Website
 Official Online Store

1977 births
Living people
Estonian jewellery designers
Estonian Academy of Arts alumni
People from Tallinn
Estonian LGBT people
21st-century Estonian male artists